Tionesta Creek is a tributary of the Allegheny River in Forest, Clarion, Warren, McKean, and Elk Counties in Pennsylvania in the United States.

See also
 List of rivers of Pennsylvania
 List of tributaries of the Allegheny River

References

External links
U.S. Geological Survey: PA stream gaging stations

Rivers of Pennsylvania
Tributaries of the Allegheny River
Allegheny National Forest
Rivers of Clarion County, Pennsylvania
Rivers of Forest County, Pennsylvania
Rivers of McKean County, Pennsylvania
Rivers of Warren County, Pennsylvania
Rivers of Elk County, Pennsylvania